Bhutan National Bank is a commercial bank founded in 1997 and located in Thimphu, capital of the Kingdom of Bhutan.

History 
The main events include:
 
1980 - the Unit Trust of Bhutan was founded by the Royal Government and the Royal Insurance Corporation of Bhutan (RICB)
1992 - the Trust received the status of independent financial institution
1995 - with the assistance of the Asian Development Bank the Trust was converted to a commercial bank Bhutan National Bank 
1996 - the bank's equity was offered to the public
1997 - the bank was officially opened, 40 percent of its equity was sold to the Asian Development Bank and Citibank
2004 - launched the first ATM services in Bhutan
2007 - introduced the debit Point of Sale terminals in Bhutan
2009 - started the SMS banking and Internet banking
2011 - introduced the recurring deposit and Rupee Denominated Prepaid card.

See also 
List of banks in Asia

References

External links 
Homepage

Banks of Bhutan
Banks established in 1997
1997 establishments in Bhutan
Companies listed on the Royal Securities Exchange of Bhutan
Companies based in Thimphu